Xu Guanhua (born 16 December 1942) is a Chinese scientist and politician who served as Minister of Science and Technology from 2001 to 2007. He also served as chairperson of the Education, Science, Health and Sports Committee of the Chinese People's Political Consultative Conference from 2008 to 2013. He was a member of the 16th Central Committee of the Chinese Communist Party. He was a member of the Standing Committee of the 11th Chinese People's Political Consultative Conference.

Biography
Xu was born in Shanghai, on 16 December 1942. In 1971, he joined the faculty of Chang'an University, and worked there until 1979.

After the Reform and Opening Up in 1979, he was sent to study at Stockholm University on government scholarships, and returned to China in 1981. He joined the Chinese Communist Party (CCP) in September 1984. He was appointed director of the Institute of Remote Sensing Applications, Chinese Academy of Sciences, in February 1993, and was elevated to vice president in August 1994. 

Xu got involved in politics in 1995, when he was chosen as deputy director of the National Technical Committee. After the institutional reform, he served as the vice minister of science and technology in 1998. He moved up the ranks to become minister on 28 February 2001. In March 2008, he took office as chairperson of the Education, Science, Health and Sports Committee of the Chinese People's Political Consultative Conference, serving in the post until his retirement in March 2013.

Personal life
Xu married Yu Dongjie, the couple have a son and a daughter.

Honours and awards
 1992 Member of the Chinese Academy of Sciences (CAS)
 2001 Fellow of The World Academy of Sciences (TWAS)
 October 2003 Foreign Fellow of the Royal Swedish Academy of Engineering Sciences
 October 2005 Fellow of the International Academy of Astronautics (IAA)

References

External links
 Biography of Xu Guanhua on china.org.cn

1941 births
Living people
Beijing Forestry University alumni
Stockholm University alumni
People's Republic of China politicians from Shanghai
Chinese Communist Party politicians from Shanghai
Members of the Chinese Academy of Sciences
TWAS fellows
Ministers of Science and Technology of the People's Republic of China
Members of the 16th Central Committee of the Chinese Communist Party
Members of the Standing Committee of the 11th Chinese People's Political Consultative Conference